Ladda puracensis is a species of butterfly in the family Hesperiidae. It is found in Colombia and Ecuador.

Subspecies
Ladda puracensis puracensis - Colombia
Ladda puracensis cotopa Steinhauser, 1991 - Ecuador
Ladda puracensis quindio Steinhauser, 1991 - Colombia

References

Butterflies described in 1991